Andrew Phillips (born 27 January 1970) is a former Australian rules footballer who played for the Carlton Football Club in the Australian Football League (AFL). 

Phillips's nephews Tom and Ed Phillips currently play in the AFL.

Notes

External links

Andrew Phillips's profile at Blueseum

1970 births
Carlton Football Club players
Melbourne High School Old Boys Football Club players
Australian rules footballers from Victoria (Australia)
Living people
Victorian State of Origin players